Hofner Blue Notes is the nineteenth studio album by British singer-songwriter Chris Rea, released in 2003 by his own record label, Jazzee Blue. The album was part of series of largely instrumental blues and jazz albums released by his label Jazzee Blue and mostly fronted by his band members, of which this album was preceded by Rea's eighteenth studio and instrumental album Blue Street (Five Guitars) in 2003.

The album was part of Hofner Blue Notes, a project about Höfner guitar because Rea's first electric guitar was a 1961 Höfner V3 bought from a second-hand shop while he was working in his father's ice cream factory in early 1970s, and continued with The Return of the Fabulous Hofner Bluenotes in 2008.

Track listing 
 "Spy" - 5:05
 "Expectations" - 3:59
 "Hofner Blue Notes" - 2:52
 "Paris in Minneapolis" - 5:05
 "São Paulo Blue" - 4:58
 "What Became" - 4:44
 "Detroit" - 3:54
 "Goodnight Joe" - 4:15
 "Take the Mingus Train" - 4:24
 "Alone" - 3:39
 "Saudi Blue" - 4:06
 "Kestrel Avenue" - 3:28

Personnel 
 Chris Rea – all instruments, paintings
 Kiadan Quinn – producer 
 Stuart Epps – engineer 
 Stewart Eales – engineer
 Mainartery – album design 
 John Knowles – management 
 Recorded at Sol Mill Studios (Berkshire, England).
 Mastered at The Soundmasters (London, UK).

References

External links 
 

2004 albums
Chris Rea albums